Zhang Naiqi (1897–1977) was a Chinese politician who served as Minister of Food between 1952 and 1957. He was one of the founders of the China Democratic National Construction Association.

Biography
Zhang was born in Qingtian County, Zhejiang, during the late Qing dynasty, on 4 March 1897. Zhang joined the Xinhai Revolution Army in 1911. In 1913, Zhang attended Hangzhou Provincial School of Business, after graduating, he worked in Zhejiang Industry Bank.

In 1927, Zhang set up a magazine named New Review. He wrote articles supporting the Kuomintang party. In 1935, Zhang Naiqi and Ma Xiangbo found the Shanghai Cultural of National Salvation Association. In November 1936, Zhang was arrested by the Nationalist Government.

During the Second Sino-Japanese War  (1937 – 1945), Zhang was released. Zhang served as the chief of Anhui Treasury Department. After 1945, Zhang and Huang Yanpei found the China Democratic National Construction Association.

In 1949, Zhang went to Beijing and served as an adviser to the People's Bank of China. In 1952, Zhang served as the head of the Food Department of the People's Republic of China. Zhang, Chen Shutong and Li Weihan founded the All-China Federation of Industry and Commerce in which he served as the vice chairman. From 1949 to 1954, he was the Government Administration Council of the Central People's Government member.

In 1957, Zhang Naiqi along with Zhang Bojun, Chu Anping and Luo Longji were classified as rightists. On 8 June 1957, Zhang was removed from his posts and persecuted.

On 13 May 1977, Zhang died of illness in a Beijing Hospital basement. Zhang Naiqi's memory was rehabilitated by Deng Xiaoping in 1980.

Personal life

Zhang Naiqi married four times during his life and had 8 children. He had five children (three sons and two daughters) by Wang Jing'e, one daughter by Hu Ziying, one daughter by Jiang Yan, and one son by Sun Caiping.

By Jiang Jing'e:
 daughter Zhang Xianghua
 son Zhang Yijun
 daughter Zhang Wan

By Hu Ziying:
 daughter Zhang Xianggu

By Jiang Yan:
 daughter Dong Shuping

By Sun Caiping:
 son Zhang Lifan

References

1897 births
1977 deaths
People from Qingtian County
People's Republic of China politicians from Zhejiang
Republic of China economists
Politicians from Lishui
Victims of the Anti-Rightist Campaign
Victims of the Cultural Revolution
People's Republic of China economists
Writers from Lishui
Republic of China writers
Economists from Zhejiang